Warren Webster is CEO of media and entertainment company Atlas Obscura. He was previously the president and co-founder of Patch Media, a network of more than 900 local news sites launched in 2007 and sold in 2009 to AOL. Webster departed Patch in 2014 to become COO of goop, the lifestyle company founded by actress Gwyneth Paltrow.

Webster was named in Forbes Magazine as Arianna Huffington's list of "Most Powerful People in Media" alongside Patch Editor-in-Chief Brian Farnham, as well as Business Insider's "SAI 100 New York Tech" list in 2010 and 2011.  Originally from Osterville, Massachusetts, Webster attended St. Lawrence University and lives in New York City.

References 

Living people
St. Lawrence University alumni
AOL people
American technology company founders
People from Osterville, Massachusetts
Year of birth missing (living people)